Nilsa Cruz-Perez (born January 21, 1961) is an American Democratic Party politician who was sworn into office to represent the 5th Legislative District in the New Jersey Senate on December 15, 2014, to fill the vacant seat of Donald Norcross. She had previously served in the New Jersey General Assembly from 1995 to 2010 and is the first Latina woman to serve in the Assembly.

Early life 
Cruz-Perez born on January 21, 1961, in Bayamón, Puerto Rico. She attended the University of Puerto Rico earning a degree in political science, Big Bend Community College Army Quartermaster School and the Temple University Overseas Division. Cruz-Perez served in the United States Army from 1981 to 1987, attaining the rank of sergeant. Cruz-Perez works as a part-time community development specialist for the Camden County Improvement Authority. Formerly a resident of Camden, she now resides in Barrington.

New Jersey Assembly 
Cruz-Perez was selected in February 1995 to fill the vacancy created by resignation of Assemblyman Wayne R. Bryant, when Bryant was selected to fill the Senate seat vacated due to the death of Senator Walter Rand on January 6, 1995. She was sworn into the Assembly on February 27. Serving in the Assembly until 2010, representing the 5th District for the entire time she was serving, she was the Assistant Majority Leader from 2002–2005 and Deputy Majority Leader from January 2008 to January 2010. In 2009 she announced that she would retire after her current term in the legislature.

Cruz-Perez was the primary sponsor of Bill S2599 which seeks to change the legal term of “illegal alien” to “undocumented foreign national."

Committee assignments 
Consumer Affairs
Housing and Local Government
Human Services
Military and Veterans Affairs

New Jersey Senate 
Following the election and swearing in of State Senator Donald Norcross to the United States House of Representatives in 2014, the Democratic committees of Camden and Gloucester counties (the two counties within the 5th district) appointed Cruz-Perez to the vacant Senate seat. She will serve until a special election in 2015 in which she is running. While in the Senate, she is serving on the Economic Growth, (vice-chair), Military and Veterans' Affairs, and Transportation committees and Joint Committee on the Public Schools. In addition to her legislative duties, she is also a Vice-Chair of the New Jersey Democratic State Committee (since 2015) and a member of the Rutgers University–Camden Board of Directors (since 2014). Between her legislative stints, she was the Democratic Vice-Chair of the 2011 New Jersey Apportionment Commission, the committee delegated to redraw the state legislative districts following the 2010 Census.

Committee assignments 
Economic Growth
State Government, Wagering, Tourism & Historic Preservation
Joint Committee on Housing Affordability
Budget and Appropriations

District 5 
New Jersey's 5th Legislative Districts comprises parts of Camden and Gloucester counties. The current representatives to the 218th New Jersey Legislature are:
Senator Nilsa Cruz-Perez   (D) 
Assemblyman William Spearman   (D) , and
Assemblywoman Patricia Egan Jones   (D)

Electoral history

New Jersey Senate

New Jersey Assembly

References

External links
Senator Cruz-Perez's legislative web page, New Jersey Legislature
New Jersey Legislature financial disclosure forms
2015 2014 2008 2007 2006 2005 2004
Nilsa I. Cruz-Perez, Project Vote Smart

1961 births
American politicians of Puerto Rican descent
Living people
Democratic Party New Jersey state senators
Democratic Party members of the New Jersey General Assembly
Politicians from Camden, New Jersey
People from Barrington, New Jersey
People from Bayamón, Puerto Rico
Temple University alumni
United States Army soldiers
University of Puerto Rico alumni
Women state legislators in New Jersey
Women in the United States Army
Puerto Rican people in New Jersey politics
Hispanic and Latino American women in politics
Puerto Rican women in the military
21st-century American politicians
21st-century American women politicians
Hispanic and Latino American state legislators in New Jersey